Harrison Mills is an unincorporated community in Scioto County, in the U.S. state of Ohio.

History
A post office called Harrison Mills was established in 1862, and remained in operation until 1903. Besides the post office, Harrison Mills had a United Brethren church, established in 1902.

References

Unincorporated communities in Scioto County, Ohio
Unincorporated communities in Ohio